Andrés Santoyo (born 6 January 1952) is a Mexican weightlifter. He competed at the 1976 Summer Olympics and the 1980 Summer Olympics.

References

1952 births
Living people
Mexican male weightlifters
Olympic weightlifters of Mexico
Weightlifters at the 1976 Summer Olympics
Weightlifters at the 1980 Summer Olympics
Place of birth missing (living people)
Pan American Games medalists in weightlifting
Pan American Games silver medalists for Mexico
Weightlifters at the 1975 Pan American Games
20th-century Mexican people
21st-century Mexican people